In mathematics, a Catalan solid, or Archimedean dual, is a polyhedron that is dual to an Archimedean solid. There are 13 Catalan solids. They are named for the Belgian mathematician Eugène Catalan, who first described them in 1865.

The Catalan solids are all convex. They are face-transitive but not vertex-transitive. This is because the dual Archimedean solids are vertex-transitive and not face-transitive. Note that unlike Platonic solids and Archimedean solids, the faces of Catalan solids are not regular polygons.  However, the vertex figures of Catalan solids are regular, and they have constant dihedral angles. Being face-transitive, Catalan solids are isohedra.

Additionally, two of the Catalan solids are edge-transitive: the rhombic dodecahedron and the rhombic triacontahedron. These are the duals of the two quasi-regular Archimedean solids.

Just as prisms and antiprisms are generally not considered Archimedean solids, so bipyramids and trapezohedra are generally not considered Catalan solids, despite being face-transitive.

Two of the Catalan solids are chiral: the pentagonal icositetrahedron and the pentagonal hexecontahedron, dual to the chiral snub cube and snub dodecahedron. These each come in two enantiomorphs. Not counting the enantiomorphs, bipyramids, and trapezohedra, there are a total of 13 Catalan solids.

List of Catalan solids and their duals 

All Catalan solids to scale with Archimedean solid edges superimposed. Sorted by midradius in descending order:

All facets of Catalan solids, same scale as above:

Symmetry 
The Catalan solids, along with their dual Archimedean solids, can be grouped in those with tetrahedral, octahedral and icosahedral symmetry.
For both octahedral and icosahedral symmetry there are six forms. The only Catalan solid with genuine tetrahedral symmetry is the triakis tetrahedron (dual of the truncated tetrahedron). The rhombic dodecahedron and tetrakis hexahedron have octahedral symmetry, but they can be colored to have only tetrahedral symmetry. Rectification and snub also exist with tetrahedral symmetry, but they are Platonic instead of Archimedean, so their duals are Platonic instead of Catalan. (They are shown with brown background in the table below.)

Geometry

All dihedral angles of a Catalan solid are equal.
.

Triangular faces
Of the 13 Catalan solids, 7 have triangular faces. These are of the form Vp.q.r, where p, q and r take their values among 3, 4, 5, 6, 8 and 10. The angles ,  and  can be computed in the following way.
. 
Then 
,
.
For  and  the expressions  are similar of course. The dihedral angle  can be computed from 
.

Quadrilateral faces
Of the 13 Catalan solids, 4 have quadrilateral faces. These are of the form Vp.q.p.r, where p, q and r take their values among 3, 4, and 5. The angle can be computed by the following formula:
. 
From this,  and the dihedral angle can be easily computed. Then  and  can be found by applying the formulas for the triangular case. The angle  can be computed similarly of course.
The faces are kites, or, if , rhombi.
Applying this, for example, to the deltoidal icositetrahedron (and ), we get .

Pentagonal faces
Of the 13 Catalan solids, 2 have pentagonal faces. These are of the form Vp.p.p.p.q, where p=3, and q=4 or 5. The angle can be computed by solving a degree three equation:
.

Metric properties
Then  is an Archimedean solid with the same midsphere.
,

,

,

.

As an example, let  be a cuboctahedron with edge length . Then  is a rhombic dodecahedron.

,

The radius  of this sphere is given by
.

Then the edges of  joining vertices of type  and type  have length . These quantities can be computed by
,

The dihedral angles between -gonal and -gonal faces of  satisfy
.

Construction

The face of any Catalan polyhedron may be obtained from the vertex figure of the dual Archimedean solid using the Dorman Luke construction.

Application to other solids

All of the formulae of this section apply to the Platonic solids, and bipyramids and trapezohedra with equal dihedral angles as well, because they can be derived from the constant dihedral angle property only. This is not surprising: it is possible to cut off both apexes in such a way as to obtain a regular dodecahedron.

See also 
 List of uniform tilings Shows dual uniform polygonal tilings similar to the Catalan solids
 Conway polyhedron notation A notational construction process
 Archimedean solid
 Johnson solid

Notes

References 
 Eugène Catalan Mémoire sur la Théorie des Polyèdres. J. l'École Polytechnique (Paris) 41, 1-71, 1865.
.
.
 Alan Holden Shapes, Space, and Symmetry. New York: Dover, 1991.
 (The thirteen semiregular convex polyhedra and their duals)
 (Section 3-9)
  Chapter 4: Duals of the Archimedean polyhedra, prisma and antiprisms

External links

 
 
 Catalan Solids – at Visual Polyhedra
 Archimedean duals – at Virtual Reality Polyhedra
Interactive Catalan Solid in Java
Download link for Catalan's original 1865 publication – with beautiful figures, PDF format

Polyhedra